is a 2012 Japanese film directed by Toshiro Saiga.

Plot
It is set in a small fishing village in Shikamachi, Ishikawa Prefecture, who depend on the local amateur orchestra as their favorite source of entertainment. When the conductor dies unexpectedly, the townspeople recruit the man's granddaughter, a high school student with a talent for conducting.

The song "Land of Hope and Glory" features in the movie.

Cast
Kasumi Arimura as Misaki Yoshikawa
Yumiko Shaku as Midori Mimura
Keizo Kanie as Genji Arasawa
Mariko Tsutsui as Youko Isaka
Eisuke Sasai as Iwao Ono
Taiko Katono Masaya Ono
Matsu (Exile) (Toshio Matsumoto) as Masaru Arasawa
Gin Maeda as Tatsuji Minatogawa, aka Tatsu-jiji
Michiyoshi Inoue as Maestro Orfenstein
Hisahiro Ogura as Hiroshi Taniguchi

Release
It got an early release at select theaters in Ishikawa Prefecture on December 1, 2012, and was then released theatrically throughout Japan on February 1, 2013. The DVD was released in Japan on August 23, 2013.

References

External links
 
 

2012 films
Films shot in Ishikawa Prefecture
Films set in Ishikawa Prefecture
2010s Japanese films